HSC may stand for:

Business
 Hughes Systique Corporation
 Halifax Shopping Centre
 Harmonized System Code
 Harsco Corporation

Computing
 HSC50 (Hierarchical Storage Controller), using DEC Mass Storage Control Protocol
 Hughes Systique Corporation

Medicine
 Health and Social Care in Northern Ireland
 Hematopoietic stem cell
 Hepatic stellate cell
 Hospital for Sick Children, Toronto, Canada
 Hydraulic Sinus Condensing, a technique used in dentistry to lift the sinus
 Hysteroscopy, a method for looking into the uterus via the cervix

Organizations
 Harare Sports Club, sports venue in Zimbabwe
 Health Service Commissioner for England
 Health Sponsorship Council
 Heraldry Society of Canada
 Huntington Society of Canada
 Health and Safety Commission
 Horizon Scanning Centre (HSC)
 United States Homeland Security Council

Schooling

Certificates

 Higher School Certificate (New South Wales), Australia
 Higher School Certificate (Victoria), Australia
 Higher School Certificate (UK)
 Higher Secondary (School) Certificate (South Asian countries)

Schools
 Hampden–Sydney College
 Hillfield Strathallan College, private school in Hamilton, Ontario, Canada
 Hsin Sheng College of Medical Care and Management, private junior college in Taoyuan City, Taiwan

Related
 Hindu Students Council

Other
 High-speed craft
 Houston Ship Channel
 Hyper Suprime-Cam, camera for Subaru Telescope
 Mauser HSc, pistol
 Shaoguan Guitou Airport, IATA code